Sunil Babu Pant, currently Bhikshu Kashyap, is a former LGBT activist and politician. He was the first openly gay national-level legislator in Asia. Since 2021, he has become a Buddhist monk and is known as Bhikshu Kashyap.

Early life 
Pant was born to a Brahmin family in Gorkha District of Nepal. He has a master's degree in computer science from Minsk. He enrolled at Hong Kong University of Science and Technology but dropped out after six months to volunteer for the victims of the 1999 Odisha cyclone. In 2001, he formed the Blue Diamond Society, Nepal's first LGBT organisation, which in 2008 had 120,000 members.

Career 
Pant hosted a television talk show on LGBT rights called Pahichaan for two years. He was among the 29 Human Rights leaders who were signatories of the Yogyakarta Principles formulated in November 2006. The Supreme Court of Nepal, in Sunil Babu Pant and Others v. Government of Nepal and Others, decriminalized homosexuality and allowed same-sex marriage in Nepal in 2008.

Impressed with the support that Pant canvassed from LGBT voters, the CPN(U) offered him one of the five proportional support seats it had secured in the constituent assembly in 2008. Pant was a member of the Fundamental Rights committee in the new constituent assembly, and was instrumental in securing full protection for the LGBT community in the new draft constitution. He resigned as the director of Blue Diamond Society in June 2013 after he was accused of drawing two salaries, one as a parliamentarian and one as the director. Pant and his supporters joined the Communist Party of Nepal (Unified Marxist–Leninist) in 2013, though he was not given one of the 175 seats won by them, as they had ruled out all leaders who had served in the previous assembly.

Pant founded the Peace Environment Development NGO to work on issues concerning climate change. He also established Nepal's first gay travel agency, Pink Mountain, which offered tailor-made tourist services to gay couples. In June 2011, Pant conducted the first public gay marriage ceremony in Nepal, between a lawyer and a professor from Denver. He was nominated by Norwegian MPs Anette Trettebergstuen and Håkon Haugli for the 2014 Nobel Peace Prize.

Pant attracted much media attention in 2012 when he wrote an open letter to Mark Zuckerberg and Chris Hughes, urging Facebook to allow its users to list their gender as "Other". Out Run, a documentary by filmmakers S. Leo Chiang and Johnny Symons, is said to be inspired by his life story. The film follows the journey of Bemz Benedito, a leader of an LGBT political party, and her bid to become the first transgender woman elected to the Congress.

References 

Living people
Year of birth missing (living people)
Communist Party of Nepal (United) politicians
Gay politicians
Nepalese LGBT people
Nepalese LGBT politicians
Communist Party of Nepal (Unified Marxist–Leninist) politicians
LGBT legislators
People from Gorkha District
Members of the 1st Nepalese Constituent Assembly
LGBT Buddhists
Converts to Buddhism from Hinduism